This is a complete list of Scottish Statutory Instruments in 2007.

1-100

 Products of Animal Origin (Third Country Imports) (Scotland) Regulations 2007 (S.S.I. 2007/1)
 Non-Domestic Rate (Scotland) Order 2007 (S.S.I. 2007/2)
 Argyll and Bute Council (Pilotage Powers) Order 2007 (S.S.I. 2007/3)
 Road Works (Inspection Fees) (Scotland) Amendment Regulations 2007 (S.S.I. 2007/4)
 Tarbert (Loch Fyne) Harbour Revision (Constitution) Order 2007 (S.S.I. 2007/5)
 Act of Sederunt (Ordinary Cause, Summary Application, Summary Cause and Small Claim Rules) Amendment (Miscellaneous) 2007 (S.S.I. 2007/6)
 Act of Sederunt (Rules of the Court of Session Amendment) (Miscellaneous) 2007 (S.S.I. 2007/7)
 Drugs Assessor (Qualifications and Experience) (Scotland) Regulations 2007 (S.S.I. 2007/8)
 Health Act 2006 (Commencement No. 1) (Scotland) Order 2007 (S.S.I. 2007/9)
 Health and Social Care (Community Health and Standards) Act 2003 (Commencement No. 1 and Savings) (Scotland) Order 2007 (S.S.I. 2007/10)
 Food Hygiene (Scotland) Amendment Regulations 2007 (S.S.I. 2007/11)
 Prohibition of Fishing with Multiple Trawls (No. 2) (Scotland) Amendment Order 2007 (S.S.I. 2007/13)
 Civil Legal Aid (Scotland) (Fees) Amendment Regulations 2007 (S.S.I. 2007/14)
 Antisocial Behaviour (Fixed Penalty Offence) (Prescribed Area) (Scotland) Regulations 2007 (S.S.I. 2007/15)
 Tenements (Scotland) Act 2004 (Prescribed Risks) Order 2007 (S.S.I. 2007/16)
 Tenements (Scotland) Act 2004 (Commencement No. 2) Order 2007 (S.S.I. 2007/17)
 Tweed Regulation Order 2007 (S.S.I. 2007/19)
 Adults with Incapacity (Ethics Committee) (Scotland) Amendment Regulations 2007 (S.S.I. 2007/22)
 Strathclyde Passenger Transport Authority (Constitution, Membership and Transitional and Consequential Provisions) Amendment Order 2007 (S.S.I. 2007/23)
 Police Grant (Variation) (Scotland) Order 2007 (S.S.I. 2007/24)
 Local Governance (Scotland) Act 2004 (Commencement No. 4) Order 2007 (S.S.I. 2007/25)
 Local Electoral Administration and Registration Services (Scotland) Act 2006 (Commencement No. 2 and Transitional Provisions) Order 2007 (S.S.I. 2007/26)
 Sulphur Content of Liquid Fuels (Scotland) Regulations 2007 (S.S.I. 2007/27)
 Police (Injury Benefit) (Scotland) Revocation Regulations 2007 (S.S.I. 2007/28)
 Contaminants in Food (Scotland) Regulations 2007 (S.S.I. 2007/29)
 Specified Animal Pathogens Amendment (Scotland) Order 2007 (S.S.I. 2007/30)
 Scottish Schools (Parental Involvement) Act 2006 (Commencement No. 2) Order 2007 (S.S.I. 2007/31)
 Sex Discrimination (Public Authorities) (Statutory Duties) (Scotland) Order 2007 (S.S.I. 2007/32)
 Licensing Register (Scotland) Regulations 2007 (S.S.I. 2007/33)
 Licence Transfer (Prescribed Persons) (Scotland) Regulations 2007 (S.S.I. 2007/34)
 Licensing (Closure Orders) (Scotland) Regulations 2007 (S.S.I. 2007/35)
 Non Domestic Rating (Rural Areas and Rateable Value Limits) (Scotland) Amendment Order 2007 (S.S.I. 2007/36)
 Notification of Marketing of Food for Particular Nutritional Uses (Scotland) Regulations 2007 (S.S.I. 2007/37)
 Food Protection (Emergency Prohibitions) (Radioactivity in Sheep) Partial Revocation (Scotland) Order 2007 (S.S.I. 2007/38)
 Sea Fishing (Prohibition on the Removal of Shark Fins) (Scotland) Order 2007 (S.S.I. 2007/39)
 Sea Fishing (Restriction on Days at Sea) (Scotland) Order 2007 (S.S.I. 2007/40)
 Scottish Local Government Elections Order 2007 (S.S.I. 2007/42)
 Tourist Boards (Scotland) Act 2006 (Commencement) Order 2007 (S.S.I. 2007/47)
 Planning etc. (Scotland) Act 2006 (Commencement No. 1) Order 2007 (S.S.I. 2007/49)
 Water Environment and Water Services (Scotland) Act 2003 (Commencement No. 5) Order 2007 (S.S.I. 2007/50)
 Registration Services (Miscellaneous Provisions) (Scotland) Regulations 2007 (S.S.I. 2007/52)
 Registration of Civil Partnerships (Prescription of Forms, Publicisation and Errors) (Scotland) Amendment Regulations 2007 (S.S.I. 2007/53)
 Registration of Births, Deaths and Marriages (Re registration) (Scotland) Regulations 2007 (S.S.I. 2007/54)
 Smoke Control Areas (Exempt Fireplaces) (Scotland) Order 2007 (S.S.I. 2007/55)
 Smoke Control Areas (Authorised Fuels) (Scotland) Amendment Regulations 2007 (S.S.I. 2007/56)
 Legal Profession and Legal Aid (Scotland) Act 2007 (Commencement No. 1) Order 2007 (S.S.I. 2007/57)
 Title Conditions (Scotland) Act 2003 (Rural Housing Bodies) Amendment Order 2007 (S.S.I. 2007/58)
 Civil Legal Aid (Scotland) Amendment Regulations 2007 (S.S.I. 2007/59)
 Advice and Assistance (Scotland) Amendment Regulations 2007 (S.S.I. 2007/60)
 Avian Influenza (H5N1 in Wild Birds) (Scotland) Order 2007 (S.S.I. 2007/61)
 Avian Influenza (H5N1 in Poultry) (Scotland) Order 2007 (S.S.I. 2007/62)
 Sea Fish (Prohibited Methods of Fishing) (Firth of Clyde) Order 2007 (S.S.I. 2007/63)
 Local Government Finance (Scotland) Order 2007 (S.S.I. 2007/65)
 Forestry Commission Byelaws 1982 Revocation (Scotland) Byelaws 2007 (S.S.I. 2007/66)
 Regulation of Care (Scotland) Act 2001 (Commencement No. 7 and Transitional Provisions) Amendment Order 2007 (S.S.I. 2007/67)
 Police (Injury Benefit) (Scotland) Regulations 2007 (S.S.I. 2007/68)
 Avian Influenza (Preventive Measures) (Scotland) Order 2007 (S.S.I. 2007/69)
 Local Government Pensions Etc. (Councillors and VisitScotland) (Scotland) Amendment Regulations 2007 (S.S.I. 2007/71)
 Sexual Offences Act 2003 (Prescribed Police Stations) (Scotland) Amendment Regulations 2007 (S.S.I. 2007/72)
 Housing Revenue Account General Fund Contribution Limits (Scotland) Order 2007 (S.S.I. 2007/73)
 Housing (Scotland) Act 2001 (Alteration of Housing Finance Arrangements) Order 2007 (S.S.I. 2007/74)
 Rehabilitation of Offenders Act 1974 (Exclusions and Exceptions) (Scotland) Amendment Order 2007 (S.S.I. 2007/75)
 Licensing (Clubs) (Scotland) Regulations 2007 (S.S.I. 2007/76)
 Personal Licence (Scotland) Regulations 2007 (S.S.I. 2007/77)
 Food Supplements (Scotland) Amendment Regulations 2007 (S.S.I. 2007/78)
 Public Service Vehicles (Registration of Local Services) (Scotland) Amendment Regulations 2007 (S.S.I. 2007/79)
 Conservation (Natural Habitats, &c.) Amendment (Scotland) Regulations 2007 (S.S.I. 2007/80)
 Valuation Timetable (Scotland) Amendment Order 2007 (S.S.I. 2007/81)
 Bankruptcy and Diligence etc. (Scotland) Act 2007 (Commencement No. 1) Order 2007 (S.S.I. 2007/82)
 Police, Public Order and Criminal Justice (Scotland) Act 2006 (Commencement No. 3, Transitional and Savings Provisions) Order 2007 (S.S.I. 2007/84)
 Home Energy Efficiency Scheme (Scotland) Amendment Regulations 2007 (S.S.I. 2007/85)
 Act of Sederunt (Rules of the Court of Session Amendment No. 2) (Fees of Solicitors) 2007 (S.S.I. 2007/86)
 Act of Sederunt (Fees of Solicitors in the Sheriff Court) (Amendment) 2007 (S.S.I. 2007/87)
 Scottish Police Services Authority (Staff Transfer) Order 2007 (S.S.I. 2007/88)
 Police, Public Order and Criminal Justice (Scotland) Act 2006 (Consequential Modifications) Order 2007 (S.S.I. 2007/89)
 Scottish Crime and Drug Enforcement Agency (Appointment of Police Members) Regulations 2007 (S.S.I. 2007/90)
 Official Controls (Animals, Feed and Food) (Scotland) Regulations 2007 (S.S.I. 2007/91)
 Management of Offenders etc. (Scotland) Act 2005 (Specification of Persons) Order 2007 (S.S.I. 2007/92)
 Sale of Alcohol to Children and Young Persons (Scotland) Regulations 2007 (S.S.I. 2007/93)
 Potatoes Originating in Egypt (Scotland) Amendment Regulations 2007 (S.S.I. 2007/94)
 Licensing (Training) (Scotland) Regulations 2007 (S.S.I. 2007/95)
 Occasional Licence (Scotland) Regulations 2007 (S.S.I. 2007/96)
 Licensing (Designated Airports) (Scotland) Order 2007 (S.S.I. 2007/97)
 Licensing Qualification (Scotland) Regulations 2007 (S.S.I. 2007/98)
 Common Agricultural Policy Schemes (Cross-Compliance) (Scotland) Amendment Regulations 2007 (S.S.I. 2007/99)
 Adults with Incapacity (Conditions and Circumstances Applicable to Three Year Medical Treatment Certificates) (Scotland) Regulations 2007 (S.S.I. 2007/100)

101-200

 Vulnerable Witnesses (Scotland) Act 2004 (Commencement No. 4, Savings and Transitional Provisions) Order 2007 (S.S.I. 2007/101)
 National Assistance (Assessment of Resources) Amendment (Scotland) Regulations 2007 (S.S.I. 2007/102)
 National Assistance (Sums for Personal Requirements) (Scotland) Regulations 2007 (S.S.I. 2007/103)
 Adults with Incapacity (Medical Treatment Certificates) (Scotland) Regulations 2007 (S.S.I. 2007/104)
 Adults with Incapacity (Requirements for Signing Medical Treatment Certificates) (Scotland) Regulations 2007 (S.S.I. 2007/105)
 Quick-frozen Foodstuffs Amendment (Scotland) Regulations 2007 (S.S.I. 2007/106)
 Local Government (Allowances and Expenses) (Scotland) Regulations 2007 (S.S.I. 2007/108)
 Police Grant (Scotland) Order 2007 (S.S.I. 2007/109)
 Public Appointments and Public Bodies etc. (Scotland) Act 2003 (Amendment of Specified Authorities) Order 2007 (S.S.I. 2007/110)
 Police Act 1997 (Criminal Records) (Scotland) Amendment Regulations 2007 (S.S.I. 2007/112)
 Act of Sederunt (Registration Appeal Court) 2007 (S.S.I. 2007/113)
 Education (Assisted Places) (Scotland) Amendment Regulations 2007 (S.S.I. 2007/114)
 St Mary's Music School (Aided Places) (Scotland) Amendment Regulations 2007 (S.S.I. 2007/115)
 Queen Margaret University, Edinburgh (Scotland) Order of Council 2007 (S.S.I. 2007/116)
 Charities and Trustee Investment (Scotland) Act 2005 (Commencement No. 4) Order 2007 (S.S.I. 2007/117)
 Dairy Produce Quotas (Scotland) Amendment Regulations 2007 (S.S.I. 2007/118)
 Plant Protection Products (Scotland) Amendment Regulations 2007 (S.S.I. 2007/119)
 Supervised Attendance Order (Prescribed Courts) (Scotland) Order 2007 (S.S.I. 2007/120)
 Divorce etc. (Pensions) (Scotland) Amendment Regulations 2007 (S.S.I. 2007/122)
 Town and Country Planning (Prescribed Date) (Scotland) Regulations 2007 (S.S.I. 2007/123)
 Valuation Appeal Committee (Electronic Communications) (Scotland) Order 2007 124)
 Football Banning Orders (Regulated Football Matches) (Scotland) Order 2007 (S.S.I. 2007/125)
 Conservation of Seals (Scotland) Order 2007 (S.S.I. 2007/126)
 Sea Fishing (Enforcement of Community Quota and Third Country Fishing Measures) (Scotland) Order 2007 (S.S.I. 2007/127)
 Licensing (Appointed Day and Transitional Provisions) (Scotland) Order 2007 (S.S.I. 2007/128)
 Licensing (Scotland) Act 2005 (Commencement No. 3) Order 2007 (S.S.I. 2007/129)
 Planning etc. (Scotland) Act 2006 (Commencement No. 2) Order 2007 (S.S.I. 2007/130)
 Testing of Arrested Persons for Class A Drugs (Prescribed Area) (Scotland) Order 2007 (S.S.I. 2007/131)
 Parental Involvement in Headteacher and Deputy Headteacher Appointments (Scotland) Regulations 2007 (S.S.I. 2007/132)
 Marketing of Vegetable Plant Material Amendment (Scotland) Regulations 2007 (S.S.I. 2007/133)
 Police (Scotland) Amendment Regulations 2007 (S.S.I. 2007/134)
 Town and Country Planning (General Permitted Development) (Avian Influenza) (Scotland) Amendment Order 2007 (S.S.I. 2007/135)
 Charities Accounts (Scotland) Amendment Regulations 2007 (S.S.I. 2007/136)
 Plant Health (Export Certification) (Scotland) Amendment Order 2007 (S.S.I. 2007/137)
 Plant Health (Import Inspection Fees) (Scotland) Amendment Regulations 2007 (S.S.I. 2007/138)
 National Health Service (Charges for Drugs and Appliances) (Scotland) Regulations 2007 (S.S.I. 2007/139)
 Legal Profession and Legal Aid (Scotland) Act 2007 (Commencement No. 2) Order 2007 (S.S.I. 2007/140)
 Law Reform (Miscellaneous Provisions) (Scotland) Act 1990 (Commencement No. 16) Order 2007 (S.S.I. 2007/141)
 Pesticides (Maximum Residue Levels in Crops, Food and Feeding Stuffs) (Scotland) Amendment Regulations 2007 (S.S.I. 2007/142)
 Colours in Food Amendment (Scotland) Regulations 2007 (S.S.I. 2007/143)
 Meat (Official Controls Charges) (Scotland) Regulations 2007 (S.S.I. 2007/144)
 Farm Woodland Premium Schemes and SFGS Farmland Premium Scheme Amendment (Scotland) Scheme 2007 (S.S.I. 2007/146)
 Tuberculosis (Scotland) Order 2007 (S.S.I. 2007/147)
 Education (Graduate Endowment, Student Fees and Support) (Scotland) Revocation Regulations 2007 (S.S.I. 2007/148)
 Education Authority Bursaries (Scotland) Regulations 2007 (S.S.I. 2007/149)
 Welfare of Animals (Slaughter or Killing) Amendment (Scotland) Regulations 2007 (S.S.I. 2007/150)
 Nursing and Midwifery Student Allowances (Scotland) Regulations 2007 151)
 Education (Fees and Awards) (Scotland) Regulations 2007 (S.S.I. 2007/152)
 Students' Allowances (Scotland) Regulations 2007 (S.S.I. 2007/153)
 Education (Student Loans) (Scotland) Regulations 2007 (S.S.I. 2007/154)
 Education Maintenance Allowances (Scotland) Regulations 2007 (S.S.I. 2007/156)
 Civil Partnership Act 2004 (Modification of Subordinate Legislation) (Scotland) Revocation Order 2007 (S.S.I. 2007/157)
 Education (Student Loans for Tuition Fees) (Scotland) Amendment Regulations 2007 (S.S.I. 2007/158)
 Repayment of Student Loans (Scotland) Amendment Regulations 2007 (S.S.I. 2007/159)
 Napier University (Scotland) Order of Council 1993 Amendment Order of Council 2007 (S.S.I. 2007/160)
 Transport (Scotland) Act 2005 (Commencement No. 2) Order 2007 (S.S.I. 2007/161)
 Disabled Persons (Badges for Motor Vehicles) (Scotland) Amendment Regulations 2007 (S.S.I. 2007/162)
 Land Reform (Scotland) Act 2003 (Path Orders) Regulations 2007 (S.S.I. 2007/163)
 Individual Learning Account (Scotland) Amendment Regulations 2007 (S.S.I. 2007/164)
 Registered Social Landlords Accounting Requirements (Scotland) Order 2007 (S.S.I. 2007/165)
 Building (Scotland) Amendment Regulations 2007 (S.S.I. 2007/166)
 Building (Procedure) (Scotland) Amendment Regulations 2007 (S.S.I. 2007/167)
 Building (Forms) (Scotland) Amendment Regulations 2007 (S.S.I. 2007/168)
 Building (Fees) (Scotland) Amendment Regulations 2007 (S.S.I. 2007/169)
 Representation of the People (Absent Voting at Local Government Elections) (Scotland) Regulations 2007 (S.S.I. 2007/170)
 Bell College of Technology (Transfer and Closure) (Scotland) Order 2007 (S.S.I. 2007/171)
 Waste Management Licensing Amendment (Waste Electrical and Electronic Equipment) (Scotland) Regulations 2007 (S.S.I. 2007/172)
 Private Rented Housing Panel (Applications and Determinations) (Scotland) Regulations 2007 (S.S.I. 2007/173)
 Cattle Identification (Scotland) Regulations 2007 (S.S.I. 2007/174)
 Town and Country Planning (Marine Fish Farming) (Scotland) Regulations 2007 (S.S.I. 2007/175)
 Planning etc. (Scotland) Act 2006 (Consequential Provisions) Order 2007 (S.S.I. 2007/176)
 Town and Country Planning (General Development Procedure) (Scotland) Amendment Order 2007 (S.S.I. 2007/177)
 Surface Waters (Fishlife) (Classification) (Scotland) Amendment Regulations 2007 (S.S.I. 2007/178)
 Radioactive Contaminated Land (Scotland) Regulations 2007 (S.S.I. 2007/179)
 Criminal Legal Aid (Scotland) (Fees) Amendment Regulations 2007 (S.S.I. 2007/180)
 Civil Legal Aid (Scotland) (Fees) Amendment (No. 2) Regulations 2007 (S.S.I. 2007/181)
 Air Quality Standards (Scotland) Regulations 2007 (S.S.I. 2007/182)
 Local Governance (Scotland) Act 2004 (Remuneration) Regulations 2007 (S.S.I. 2007/183)
 Seeds (Fees) (Scotland) Amendment Regulations 2007 (S.S.I. 2007/184)
 Inshore Fishing (Prohibited Methods of Fishing) (Loch Creran) Order 2007 (S.S.I. 2007/185)
 Inshore Fishing (Prohibited Methods of Fishing) (Firth of Lorn) Order 2007 (S.S.I. 2007/186)
 Debt Arrangement Scheme (Scotland) Amendment (No. 2) Regulations 2007 (S.S.I. 2007/187)
 Curd Cheese (Restriction on Placing on the Market) (Scotland) Revocation Regulations 2007 (S.S.I. 2007/188)
 Teachers' Superannuation (Scotland) Amendment Regulations 2007 (S.S.I. 2007/189)
 Prisons and Young Offenders Institutions (Scotland) Amendment Rules 2007 (S.S.I. 2007/190)
 National Health Service (General Dental Services) (Scotland) Amendment Regulations 2007 (S.S.I. 2007/191)
 National Health Service (Optical Charges and Payments) (Scotland) Amendment Regulations 2007 (S.S.I. 2007/192)
 National Health Service (General Ophthalmic Services) (Scotland) Amendment Regulations 2007 (S.S.I. 2007/193)
 Animals and Animal Products (Import and Export) (Scotland) Regulations 2007 (S.S.I. 2007/194)
 Disability Discrimination (Public Authorities) (Statutory Duties) (Scotland) Amendment Regulations 2007 (S.S.I. 2007/195)
 Gambling Act 2005 (Premises Licences and Provisional Statements) (Scotland) Regulations 2007 (S.S.I. 2007/196)
 Gambling (Premises Licence Fees) (Scotland) Regulations 2007 (S.S.I. 2007/197)
 Firefighters' Compensation Scheme (Scotland) Amendment Order 2007 (S.S.I. 2007/198)
 Firefighters' Pension Scheme (Scotland) Order 2007 (S.S.I. 2007/199)
 Firefighters' Pension Scheme Amendment (Scotland) Order 2007 (S.S.I. 2007/200)

201-300

 Police Pensions (Scotland) Regulations 2007 (S.S.I. 2007/201)
 Business Improvement Districts (Scotland) Regulations 2007 (S.S.I. 2007/202)
 Charities References in Documents (Scotland) Regulations 2007 (S.S.I. 2007/203)
 Charities Reorganisation (Scotland) Regulations 2007 (S.S.I. 2007/204)
 National Health Service (Primary Medical Services Section 17C Agreements) (Scotland) Amendment Regulations 2007 (S.S.I. 2007/205)
 National Health Service (General Medical Services Contracts) (Scotland) Amendment Regulations 2007 (S.S.I. 2007/206)
 National Health Service (Primary Medical Services Performers Lists) (Scotland) Amendment Regulations 2007 (S.S.I. 2007/207)
 National Health Service (Pharmaceutical Services) (Scotland) Amendment Regulations 2007 (S.S.I. 2007/208)
 Town and Country Planning (General Permitted Development) (Scotland) Amendment Order 2007 (S.S.I. 2007/209)
 Justices of the Peace (Scotland) Order 2007 (S.S.I. 2007/210)
 Act of Sederunt (Fees of Shorthand Writers in the Sheriff Court) (Amendment) 2007 (S.S.I. 2007/211)
 Valuation Appeal Panels and Committees (Scotland) Amendment Regulations 2007 (S.S.I. 2007/212)
 Council Tax (Discounts) (Scotland) Amendment Regulations 2007 (S.S.I. 2007/213)
 Council Tax (Discounts) (Scotland) Amendment Order 2007 (S.S.I. 2007/214)
 Council Tax (Exempt Dwellings) (Scotland) Amendment Order 2007 (S.S.I. 2007/215)
 Non-Domestic Rates (Levying) (Scotland) Regulations 2007 (S.S.I. 2007/216)
 Horse Passports (Scotland) Amendment Regulations 2007 (S.S.I. 2007/217)
 Smoking, Health and Social Care (Scotland) Act 2005 (Commencement No. 5) Order 2007 (S.S.I. 2007/218)
 Water Environment (Controlled Activities) (Scotland) Amendment Regulations 2007 (S.S.I. 2007/219)
 Bankruptcy Fees (Scotland) Amendment Regulations 2007 (S.S.I. 2007/220)
 Town and Country Planning (Application of Subordinate Legislation to the Crown) (Scotland) Amendment Order 2007 (S.S.I. 2007/221)
 Personal Injuries (NHS Charges) (Reviews and Appeals) (Scotland) Amendment Regulations 2007 (S.S.I. 2007/222)
 Health and Social Care (Community Health and Standards) Act 2003 Supplementary Provisions (Recovery of NHS Charges) (Scotland) Order 2007 (S.S.I. 2007/223)
 Seed (Scotland) (Amendments for Tests and Trials etc.) Regulations 2007 (S.S.I. 2007/224)
 National Health Service (Travelling Expenses and Remission of Charges) (Scotland) Amendment Regulations 2007 (S.S.I. 2007/225)
 Regulation of Care (Scotland) Act 2001 (Minimum Frequency of Inspections) Order 2007 (S.S.I. 2007/231)
 Transfer of Functions, Property, Rights and Liabilities from the Strathclyde Passenger Transport Executive to the Strathclyde Passenger Transport Authority Order 2007 (S.S.I. 2007/232)
 Act of Sederunt (Summary Applications, Statutory Applications and Appeals etc. Rules) Amendment (Animal Welfare Act 2006) 2007 (S.S.I. 2007/233)
 Act of Sederunt (Rules of the Court of Session Amendment No. 3) (Fees of Shorthand Writers) 2007 (S.S.I. 2007/234)
 Act of Adjournal (Criminal Procedure Rules Amendment No. 2) (Vulnerable Witnesses (Scotland) Act 2004) 2007 (S.S.I. 2007/237)
 Act of Adjournal (Criminal Procedure Rules Amendment) (Animal Health and Welfare etc.) 2007 (S.S.I. 2007/238)
 Inshore Fishing (Prohibited Methods of Fishing) (Firth of Lorn) Revocation Order 2007 (S.S.I. 2007/239)
 Inshore Fishing (Prohibited Methods of Fishing) (Firth of Lorn) (No. 2) Order 2007 (S.S.I. 2007/240)
 Serious Organised Crime and Police Act 2005 (Commencement No. 10) Order 2007 (S.S.I. 2007/241)
 Private Security Industry Act 2001 (Commencement No. 2) (Scotland) Order 2007 (S.S.I. 2007/242)
 Mental Health (Safety and Security) (Scotland) Amendment Regulations 2007 (S.S.I. 2007/243)
 Budget (Scotland) Act 2006 Amendment Order 2007 (S.S.I. 2007/244)
 Sexual Offences Act 2003 (Notification Requirements) (Scotland) Regulations 2007 (S.S.I. 2007/246)
 Advice and Assistance (Financial Conditions) (Scotland) Regulations 2007 (S.S.I. 2007/247)
 Advice and Assistance (Financial Limit) (Scotland) Amendment Regulations 2007 (S.S.I. 2007/248)
 Civil Legal Aid (Financial Conditions) (Scotland) Regulations 2007 (S.S.I. 2007/249)
 Criminal Proceedings etc. (Reform) (Scotland) Act 2007 (Commencement and Savings) Order 2007 (S.S.I. 2007/250)
 National Waste Management Plan for Scotland Regulations 2007 (S.S.I. 2007/251)
 Housing Support Grant (Scotland) Order 2007 (S.S.I. 2007/252)
 Town and Country Planning (Fees for Applications and Deemed Applications) (Scotland) Amendment Regulations 2007 (S.S.I. 2007/253)
 Poultry Breeding Flocks and Hatcheries (Scotland) Order 2007 (S.S.I. 2007/254)
 Fundable Bodies (Scotland) Order 2007 (S.S.I. 2007/255)
 Prohibited Procedures on Protected Animals (Exemptions) (Scotland) Regulations 2007 (S.S.I. 2007/256)
 Animal Health and Welfare (Scotland) Act 2006 (Commencement No. 2) Order 2007 (S.S.I. 2007/257)
 Number of Inner House Judges (Variation) Order 2007 (S.S.I. 2007/258)
 National Health Service (Travelling Expenses and Remission of Charges) (Scotland) Amendment (No. 2) Regulations 2007 (S.S.I. 2007/259)
 Police, Public Order and Criminal Justice (Scotland) Act 2006 (Modification of Agency's Powers and Incidental Provision) Order 2007 (S.S.I. 2007/260)
 Business Improvement Districts (Ballot Arrangements) (Scotland) Regulations 2007 (S.S.I. 2007/261)
 Debt Arrangement Scheme (Scotland) Amendment Regulations 2007 (S.S.I. 2007/262)
 Representation of the People (Postal Voting for Local Government Elections) (Scotland) Regulations 2007 (S.S.I. 2007/263)
 Representation of the People (Post-Local Government Elections Supply and Inspection of Documents) (Scotland) Regulations 2007 (S.S.I. 2007/264)
 Local Governance (Scotland) Act 2004 (Allowances and Expenses) Regulations 2007 (S.S.I. 2007/265)
 Gambling Act 2005 (Mandatory and Default Conditions) (Scotland) Regulations 2007 (S.S.I. 2007/266)
 Renewables Obligation (Scotland) Order 2007 (S.S.I. 2007/267)
 Town and Country Planning (Marine Fish Farming) (Scotland) Order 2007 (S.S.I. 2007/268)
 Crofting Reform etc. Act 2007 (Commencement No. 1) Order 2007 (S.S.I. 2007/269)
 Housing (Scotland) Act 2006 (Commencement No. 5, Savings and Transitional Provisions) Order 2007 (S.S.I. 2007/270)
 Act of Adjournal (Criminal Procedure Rules Amendment No. 3) (Miscellaneous) 2007 (S.S.I. 2007/276)
 Act of Sederunt (Rules of the Court of Session Amendment No. 4) (Personal Injuries Actions etc.) 2007 (S.S.I. 2007/282)
 Act of Sederunt (Rules of the Court of Session Amendment No. 5) (Immigration, Asylum and Nationality Act 2006) 2007 (S.S.I. 2007/283)
 Lerwick Harbour Revision Order 2007 (S.S.I. 2007/284)

301-400

 Spreadable Fats (Marketing Standards) (Scotland) Amendment Regulations 2007 (S.S.I. 2007/303)
 Products of Animal Origin (Third Country Imports) (Scotland) Amendment Regulations 2007 (S.S.I. 2007/304)
 Vegetable Seeds Amendment (Scotland) Regulations 2007 (S.S.I. 2007/305)
 Pesticides (Maximum Residue Levels in Crops, Food and Feeding Stuffs) (Scotland) Amendment (No. 2) Regulations 2007 (S.S.I. 2007/306)
 European Fisheries Fund (Grants) (Scotland) Regulations 2007 (S.S.I. 2007/307)
 Port of Cairnryan Harbour Empowerment Order 2007 (S.S.I. 2007/308)
 Gambling Act 2005 (Fees) (Scotland) Regulations 2007 (S.S.I. 2007/309)
 Gambling Act 2005 (Fees No. 2) (Scotland) Regulations 2007 (S.S.I. 2007/311)
 Cattle Identification (Scotland) Amendment Regulations 2007 (S.S.I. 2007/312)
 Licensing (Miscellaneous Amendments) (Scotland) Regulations 2007 (S.S.I. 2007/313)
 Plant Health Fees (Scotland) Amendment Regulations 2007 (S.S.I. 2007/314)
 Education (Publication and Consultation Etc.) (Scotland) Amendment Regulations 2007 (S.S.I. 2007/315)
 Health Protection Agency (Scottish Health Functions) Amendment Order 2007 (S.S.I. 2007/316)
 National Health Service (Charges for Drugs and Appliances) (Scotland) Amendment Regulations 2007 (S.S.I. 2007/317)
 Sheriff Court Fees Amendment Order 2007 (S.S.I. 2007/318)
 Court of Session etc. Fees Amendment Order 2007 (S.S.I. 2007/319)
 Adults with Incapacity (Public Guardian's Fees) (Scotland) Amendment Regulations 2007 (S.S.I. 2007/320)
 High Court of Justiciary Fees Amendment Order 2007 (S.S.I. 2007/321)
 Discontinuance of Low Moss Prison (Scotland) Order 2007 (S.S.I. 2007/322)
 Sports Grounds and Sporting Events (Designation) (Scotland) Amendment Order 2007 (S.S.I. 2007/324)
 Addition of Vitamins, Minerals and Other Substances (Scotland) Regulations 2007 (S.S.I. 2007/325)
 Vulnerable Witnesses (Scotland) Act 2004 (Commencement No. 5, Savings and Transitional Provisions) Order 2007 (S.S.I. 2007/329)
 Bovine Semen (Scotland) Regulations 2007 (S.S.I. 2007/330)
 Gambling Act 2005 (Premises Licences and Provisional Statements) (Scotland) Amendment Regulations 2007 (S.S.I. 2007/332)
 Aquaculture and Fisheries (Scotland) Act 2007 (Commencement and Transitional Provisions) Order 2007 (S.S.I. 2007/333)
 Adult Support and Protection (Scotland) Act 2007 (Commencement No. 1, Transitional Provision and Savings) Order 2007 (S.S.I. 2007/334)
 Legal Profession and Legal Aid (Scotland) Act 2007 (Commencement No. 3) Order 2007 (S.S.I. 2007/335)
 Licensing Conditions (Late Opening Premises) (Scotland) Regulations 2007 (S.S.I. 2007/336)
 Bovine Products (Restriction on Placing on the Market) (Scotland) (No. 2) Amendment Regulations 2007 (S.S.I. 2007/338)
 Act of Sederunt (Ordinary Cause, Summary Application, Summary Cause and Small Claim Rules) Amendment (Equality Act (Sexual Orientation) Regulations 2007) 2007 (S.S.I. 2007/339)
 Renfrewshire Council (Cart Navigation) Harbour Revision Order 2007 (S.S.I. 2007/347)
 River Ness Salmon Fishery District (Baits and Lures) Regulations 2007 (S.S.I. 2007/348)
 Conservation (Natural Habitats, &c.) Amendment (No. 2) (Scotland) Regulations 2007 (S.S.I. 2007/349)
 Act of Sederunt (Rules of the Court of Session Amendment No. 6) (Recognition and Enforcement of Judgments in Civil and Commercial Matters) 2007 (S.S.I. 2007/350)
 Act of Sederunt (Sheriff Court European Enforcement Order Rules) Amendment (Extension to Denmark) 2007 (S.S.I. 2007/351)
 Reciprocal Enforcement of Maintenance Orders (United States of America) (Scotland) Order 2007 (S.S.I. 2007/354)
 Recovery of Maintenance (United States of America) (Scotland) Order 2007 (S.S.I. 2007/355)
 Transmissible Spongiform Encephalopathies (Scotland) Amendment Regulations 2007 (S.S.I. 2007/357)
 European Communities (Lawyer's Practice) (Scotland) Amendment Regulations 2007 (S.S.I. 2007/358)
 European Communities (Services of Lawyers) Amendment (Scotland) Order 2007 (S.S.I. 2007/359)
 Act of Sederunt (Rules of the Court of Session Amendment No. 7) (Devolution Issues) 2007 (S.S.I. 2007/360)
 Act of Adjournal (Criminal Procedure Rules Amendment No. 4) (Devolution Issues) 2007 (S.S.I. 2007/361)
 Act of Sederunt (Proceedings for Determination of Devolution Issues Rules) Amendment 2007 (S.S.I. 2007/362)
 Food (Suspension of the Use of E 128 Red 2G as Food Colour) (Scotland) Regulations 2007 (S.S.I. 2007/363)
 Schools (Health Promotion and Nutrition) (Scotland) Act 2007 (Commencement No. 1) Order 2007 (S.S.I. 2007/372)
 Animals and Animal Products (Import and Export) (Scotland) Amendment Regulations 2007 (S.S.I. 2007/375)
 Import and Export Restrictions (Foot-and-Mouth Disease) (Scotland) (No. 2) Regulations 2007 (S.S.I. 2007/377)
 Scottish Local Government Elections Amendment Order 2007 (S.S.I. 2007/379)
 Prostitution (Public Places) (Scotland) Act 2007 (Commencement) Order 2007 (S.S.I. 2007/382)
 Nutrition and Health Claims (Scotland) Regulations 2007 (S.S.I. 2007/383)
 Protection of Vulnerable Groups (Scotland) Act 2007 (Commencement No. 1) Order 2007 (S.S.I. 2007/385)
 Foot-and-Mouth Disease (Export Restrictions) (Scotland) Regulations 2007 (S.S.I. 2007/386)
 Disease Control (Interim Measures) (Scotland) Amendment Order 2007 (S.S.I. 2007/387)
 National Health Service (Charges for Drugs and Appliances) (Scotland) (No. 2) Regulations 2007 (S.S.I. 2007/389)
 National Health Service (Pharmaceutical Services) (Scotland) Amendment (No. 2) Regulations 2007 (S.S.I. 2007/390)
 National Health Service (Travelling Expenses and Remission of Charges) (Scotland) Amendment (No. 3) Regulations 2007 (S.S.I. 2007/391)
 National Health Service (General Medical Services Contracts) (Scotland) Amendment (No. 2) Regulations 2007 (S.S.I. 2007/392)
 National Health Service (Primary Medical Services Section 17C Agreements) (Scotland) Amendment (No. 2) Regulations 2007 393)
 Gambling Act 2005 (Review of Premises Licences) (Scotland) Regulations 2007 (S.S.I. 2007/394)
 Gambling Act 2005 (Fees No. 3) (Scotland) Regulations 2007 (S.S.I. 2007/395)
 Provision of School Education for Children under School Age (Prescribed Children) (Scotland) Amendment Order 2007 (S.S.I. 2007/396)
 Licensing (Training of Staff) (Scotland) Regulations 2007 (S.S.I. 2007/397)
 Private Security Industry Act 2001 (Designated Activities) (Scotland) Order 2007 (S.S.I. 2007/398)
 Water Industry Commissioner for Scotland (Dissolution) Order 2007 (S.S.I. 2007/399)
 Disease Control (Interim Measures) (Scotland) Amendment (No. 2) Order 2007 (S.S.I. 2007/400)

401-500

 Regulation of Care (Social Service Workers) (Scotland) Amendment Order 2007 (S.S.I. 2007/407)
 Transport (Scotland) Act 2005 (Commencement No. 3) Order 2007 (S.S.I. 2007/409)
 Plant Protection Products (Scotland) Amendment (No. 2) Regulations 2007 (S.S.I. 2007/410)
 Scottish Road Works Commissioner (Imposition of Penalties) Regulations 2007 (S.S.I. 2007/411)
 Miscellaneous Food Additives and the Sweeteners in Food Amendment (Scotland) Regulations 2007 (S.S.I. 2007/412)
 National Health Service (Primary Medical Services Performers Lists) (Scotland) Amendment (No. 2) Regulations 2007 (S.S.I. 2007/413)
 Common Agricultural Policy Single Farm Payment and Support Schemes (Scotland) Amendment Regulations 2007 (S.S.I. 2007/414)
 Plant Health (Scotland) (Amendment) Order 2007 (S.S.I. 2007/415)
 Plant Health (Phytophthora ramorum) (Scotland) Amendment Order 2007 (S.S.I. 2007/416)
 Disclosure Scotland (Staff Transfer) Order 2007 (S.S.I. 2007/417)
 Seed Potatoes (Scotland) Amendment Regulations 2007 (S.S.I. 2007/418)
 Housing (Scotland) Act 2006 (Repayment Charge and Discharge) Order 2007 (S.S.I. 2007/419)
 Zoonoses (Monitoring) (Scotland) Regulations 2007 (S.S.I. 2007/420)
 Porcine Semen (Fees) (Scotland) Regulations 2007 (S.S.I. 2007/421)
 National Health Service (General Dental Services) (Scotland) Amendment (No. 2) Regulations 2007 (S.S.I. 2007/422)
 Disease Control (Interim Measures) (Scotland) Amendment (No. 3) Order 2007 (S.S.I. 2007/423)
 Food for Particular Nutritional Uses (Scotland) (Miscellaneous Amendments) Regulations 2007 (S.S.I. 2007/424)
 Civil Legal Aid (Scotland) Amendment (No. 2) Regulations 2007 (S.S.I. 2007/425)
 University of the West of Scotland Order of Council 2007 (S.S.I. 2007/426)
 Surface Waters (Shellfish) (Classification) (Scotland) Amendment Regulations 2007 (S.S.I. 2007/427)
 Import and Export Restrictions (Foot-and-Mouth Disease) (Scotland) (No. 3) Regulations 2007 (S.S.I. 2007/428)
 Foot-and-Mouth Disease (Scotland) Amendment Order 2007 (S.S.I. 2007/429)
 Custodial Sentences and Weapons (Scotland) Act 2007 (Commencement No. 1) Order 2007 (S.S.I. 2007/431)
 Shetland Islands Council (Uyea Sound, Unst) Harbour Jurisdiction Order 2007 (S.S.I. 2007/432)
 Plastic Materials and Articles in Contact with Food (Lid Gaskets) (Scotland) Regulations 2007 (S.S.I. 2007/433)
 Police and Justice Act 2006 (Commencement) (Scotland) Order 2007 (S.S.I. 2007/434)
 Natural Mineral Water, Spring Water and Bottled Drinking Water (Scotland) Regulations 2007 (S.S.I. 2007/435)
 Administrative Justice and Tribunals Council (Listed Tribunals) (Scotland) Order 2007 (S.S.I. 2007/436)
 Smoking, Health and Social Care (Scotland) Act 2005 (Variation of Age Limit for Sale of Tobacco etc. and Consequential Modifications) Order 2007 (S.S.I. 2007/437)
 Civil Legal Aid (Scotland) (Fees) Amendment (No. 3) Regulations 2007 (S.S.I. 2007/438)
 Less Favoured Area Support Scheme (Scotland) Regulations 2007 (S.S.I. 2007/439)
 Act of Sederunt (Sheriff Court Ordinary Cause, Summary Application, Summary Cause and Small Claim Rules) Amendment (Council Regulation (EC) No. 1348 of 2000 Extension to Denmark) 2007 (S.S.I. 2007/440)
 Road Traffic (Permitted Parking Area and Special Parking Area) (City of Edinburgh) Designation Amendment Order 2007 (S.S.I. 2007/446)
 Vulnerable Witnesses (Scotland) Act 2004 (Commencement No. 6, Savings and Transitional Provisions) Order 2007 (S.S.I. 2007/447)
 Scottish Commission for Human Rights Act 2006 (Commencement No. 1) Order 2007 (S.S.I. 2007/448)
 Act of Sederunt (Rules of the Court of Session Amendment No. 8) (Miscellaneous) 2007 (S.S.I. 2007/449)
 Act of Sederunt (Rules of the Court of Session Amendment No. 9) (Vulnerable Witnesses (Scotland) Act 2004) 2007 (S.S.I. 2007/450)
 Provision of School Lunches (Disapplication of the Requirement to Charge) (Scotland) Order 2007 (S.S.I. 2007/451)
 Premises Licence (Scotland) Regulations 2007 (S.S.I. 2007/452)
 Licensing (Procedure) (Scotland) Regulations 2007 (S.S.I. 2007/453)
 Licensing (Transitional and Saving Provisions) (Scotland) Order 2007 (S.S.I. 2007/454)
 Foot-and-Mouth Disease (Scotland) Amendment (No. 2) Order 2007 (S.S.I. 2007/455)
 Housing Grants (Assessment of Contributions) (Scotland) Amendment Regulations 2007 (S.S.I. 2007/456)
 Licensing (Mandatory Conditions) (Scotland) Regulations 2007 (S.S.I. 2007/457)
 Community Care (Direct Payments) (Scotland) Amendment Regulations 2007 (S.S.I. 2007/458)
 Import and Export Restrictions (Foot-and-Mouth Disease) (Scotland) (No. 4) Regulations 2007 (S.S.I. 2007/460)
 Gambling Act 2005 (Fees No. 4) (Scotland) Regulations 2007 (S.S.I. 2007/461)
 Act of Sederunt (Ordinary Cause, Summary Application, Summary Cause and Small Claim Rules) Amendment (Vulnerable Witnesses (Scotland) Act 2004) 2007 (S.S.I. 2007/463)
 Act of Sederunt (Sheriff Court Company Insolvency Rules 1986) Amendment (Vulnerable Witnesses (Scotland) Act 2004) 2007 (S.S.I. 2007/464)
 Act of Sederunt (Proceedings in the Sheriff Court under the Debtors (Scotland) Act 1987) Amendment (Vulnerable Witnesses (Scotland) Act 2004) 2007 (S.S.I. 2007/465)
 Act of Sederunt (Debt Arrangement and Attachment (Scotland) Act 2002) Amendment (Vulnerable Witnesses (Scotland) Act 2004) 2007 (S.S.I. 2007/466)
 Act of Sederunt (Sheriff Court Bankruptcy Rules 1996) Amendment (Vulnerable Witnesses (Scotland) Act 2004) 2007 (S.S.I. 2007/467)
 Act of Sederunt (Child Care and Maintenance Rules 1997) Amendment (Vulnerable Witnesses (Scotland) Act 2004) 2007 (S.S.I. 2007/468)
 Act of Sederunt (Chancery Procedure Rules 2006) Amendment (Vulnerable Witnesses (Scotland) Act 2004) 2007 (S.S.I. 2007/469)
 Contaminants in Food (Scotland) Amendment Regulations 2007 (S.S.I. 2007/470)
 Materials and Articles in Contact with Food (Scotland) Regulations 2007 (S.S.I. 2007/471)
 Licensing (Scotland) Act 2005 (Commencement No. 4) Order 2007 (S.S.I. 2007/472)
 Import and Export Restrictions (Foot-and-Mouth Disease) (Scotland) (No. 5) Regulations 2007 (S.S.I. 2007/473)
 Housing (Scotland) Act 2006 (Consequential Amendments) Order 2007 (S.S.I. 2007/475)
 Fatal Accidents and Sudden Deaths Inquiry Procedure (Scotland) Amendment Rules 2007 (S.S.I. 2007/478)
 Criminal Proceedings etc. (Reform) (Scotland) Act 2007 (Commencement No. 2 and Transitional Provisions and Savings) Order 2007 (S.S.I. 2007/479)
 District Courts and Justices of the Peace (Scotland) Order 2007 (S.S.I. 2007/480)
 Pesticides (Maximum Residue Levels in Crops, Food and Feeding Stuffs) (Scotland) Amendment (No. 3) Regulations 2007 (S.S.I. 2007/481)
 Perth Harbour Revision Order 2007 (S.S.I. 2007/482)
 Natural Mineral Water, Spring Water and Bottled Drinking Water (Scotland) (No. 2) Regulations 2007 (S.S.I. 2007/483)
 Environmental Impact Assessment (Scotland) Amendment Regulations 2007 (S.S.I. 2007/484)
 Environmental Impact Assessment and Natural Habitats (Extraction of Minerals by Marine Dredging) (Scotland) Regulations 2007 (S.S.I. 2007/485)
 Education (School and Placing Information) (Scotland) Amendment Regulations 2007 (S.S.I. 2007/487)
 Feed (Specified Undesirable Substances) (Scotland) Regulations 2007 (S.S.I. 2007/492)
 Feed (Corn Gluten Feed and Brewers Grains) (Emergency Control) (Scotland) Revocation Regulations 2007 (S.S.I. 2007/493)
 Import and Export Restrictions (Foot-and-Mouth Disease) (Scotland) (No. 6) Regulations 2007 (S.S.I. 2007/494)
 Act of Adjournal (Criminal Procedure Rules Amendment No. 5) (Miscellaneous) 2007 (S.S.I. 2007/495)
 Small Claims (Scotland) Amendment Order 2007 (S.S.I. 2007/496)
 Legal Profession and Legal Aid (Scotland) Act 2007 (Commencement No. 4) Order 2007 (S.S.I. 2007/497)
 Plant Health (Scotland) Amendment (No. 2) Order 2007 (S.S.I. 2007/498)
 Plant Health (Import Inspection Fees) (Scotland) Amendment (No. 2) Regulations 2007 (S.S.I. 2007/499)
 National Health Service (Pharmaceutical Services) (Scotland) Amendment (No. 3) Regulations 2007 (S.S.I. 2007/500)

501-584

 The National Health Service (General Medical Services Contracts) (Scotland) Amendment (No. 3) Regulations 2007 (S.S.I. 2007/501)
 The National Health Service (Primary Medical Services Section 17C Agreements) (Scotland) Amendment (No. 3) Regulations 2007 (S.S.I. 2007/502)
 The Education (Amendments in respect of Graduate Endowment, Student Fees and Support) (Scotland) Regulations 2007 (S.S.I. 2007/503)
 The Club Gaming and Club Machine Permits (Scotland) Regulations 2007 (S.S.I. 2007/504)
 The Licensed Premises Gaming Machine Permits (Scotland) Regulations 2007 (S.S.I. 2007/505)
 The Bee Diseases and Pests Control (Scotland) Order 2007 (S.S.I. 2007/506)
 The Sheriff Courts (Scotland) Act 1971 (Privative Jurisdiction and Summary Cause) Order 2007 (S.S.I. 2007/507)
 The Remote Monitoring Requirements (Prescribed Courts) (Scotland) Revocation Regulations 2007 (S.S.I. 2007/508)
 The A9 Trunk Road (Helmsdale to Ord of Caithness Improvements - Phase 2) (Side Roads) (No. 2) Order 2007 (S.S.I. 2007/509)
 The Business Improvement Districts (Scotland) Amendment Regulations 2007 (S.S.I. 2007/510)
 Act of Adjournal (Criminal Procedure Rules Amendment No. 6) (Criminal Proceedings etc. (Reform) (Scotland) Act 2007) 2007 (S.S.I. 2007/511)
 The Water Environment and Water Services (Scotland) Act 2003 (Commencement No. 6) Order 2007 (S.S.I. 2007/512 (C. 42))
 The Licensing (Relevant Offences) (Scotland) Regulations 2007 (S.S.I. 2007/513)
 The Local Government Pension Scheme (Scotland) Amendment Regulations 2007 (S.S.I. 2007/514)
 The Public Health (Ships) (Scotland) Amendment Regulations 2007 (S.S.I. 2007/515)
 The Transport and Works (Scotland) Act 2007 (Commencement) Order 2007 (S.S.I. 2007/516 (C. 43))
 The Transport and Works (Scotland) Act 2007 (Consequential and Transitional Provisions) Order 2007 (S.S.I. 2007/517)
 The Foot-and-Mouth Disease (Export and Movement Restrictions) (Scotland) Regulations 2007 (S.S.I. 2007/518)
 The Animal Welfare Act 2006 (Commencement No. 1) (Scotland) Order 2007 (S.S.I. 2007/519 (C. 44))
 The Seed Potatoes (Fees) (Scotland) Amendment Regulations 2007 (S.S.I. 2007/520)
 The Zootechnical Standards Amendment (Scotland) Regulations 2007 (S.S.I. 2007/521)
 The Official Feed and Food Controls (Scotland) Regulations 2007 (S.S.I. 2007/522)
 The Pesticides (Maximum Residue Levels in Crops, Food and Feeding Stuffs) (Scotland) Amendment (No. 4) Regulations 2007 (S.S.I. 2007/523)
 The Fundable Bodies (Scotland) (No. 2) Order 2007 (S.S.I. 2007/524)
 The Protection of Charities Assets (Exemption) (Scotland) Amendment Order 2007 (S.S.I. 2007/525)
 The A77 Trunk Road (Dalrymple Street, Girvan) (Special Event) (Temporary Prohibition of Traffic) Order 2007 (S.S.I. 2007/526)
 The Criminal Proceedings etc. (Reform) (Scotland) Act 2007 (Commencement No. 2 and Transitional Provisions and Savings) Amendment Order 2007 (S.S.I. 2007/527)
 The Police (Promotion) (Scotland) Amendment Regulations 2007 (S.S.I. 2007/528)
 The Water Environment (Drinking Water Protected Areas) (Scotland) Order 2007 (S.S.I. 2007/529)
 The Water Environment and Water Services (Scotland) Act 2003 (Commencement No. 7) Order 2007 (S.S.I. 2007/530 (C. 45))
 The Registration Services (Fees, etc.) (Scotland) Amendment Regulations 2007 (S.S.I. 2007/531)
 Act of Sederunt (Fees of Messengers-at-Arms) 2007 (S.S.I. 2007/532)
 The Title Conditions (Scotland) Act 2003 (Conservation Bodies) Amendment Order 2007 (S.S.I. 2007/533)
 The Food Labelling (Declaration of Allergens) (Scotland) Regulations 2007 (S.S.I. 2007/534)
 The Title Conditions (Scotland) Act 2003 (Rural Housing Bodies) Amendment (No. 2) Order 2007 (S.S.I. 2007/535)
 The Seeds (Fees) (Scotland) Regulations 2007 (S.S.I. 2007/536)
 The Fishery Products (Official Controls Charges) (Scotland) Regulations 2007 (S.S.I. 2007/537)
 The Meat (Official Controls Charges) (Scotland) (No. 2) Regulations 2007 (S.S.I. 2007/538)
 Act of Sederunt (Lands Valuation Appeal Court) 2007 (S.S.I. 2007/539)
 The Criminal Proceedings etc. (Reform) (Scotland) Act 2007 (Incidental, Supplemental and Consequential Provisions) Order 2007 (S.S.I. 2007/540)
 The South West Unit Trunk Roads Area (Temporary Prohibitions of Traffic, Temporary Prohibitions of Overtaking and Temporary Speed Restrictions) (No. 11) Order 2007 (S.S.I. 2007/541)
 The South East Unit Trunk Roads Area (Temporary Prohibitions of Traffic, Temporary Prohibitions of Overtaking and Temporary Speed Restrictions) (No. 11) Order 2007 (S.S.I. 2007/542)
 The North West Unit Trunk Roads Area (Temporary Prohibitions of Overtaking and Temporary Speed Restrictions) (No. 11) Order 2007 (S.S.I. 2007/543)
 The North East Unit Trunk Roads Area (Temporary Prohibitions of Traffic, Temporary Prohibitions of Overtaking and Temporary Speed Restrictions) (No. 11) Order 2007 (S.S.I. 2007/544)
 The Licensing (Vessels etc.) (Scotland) Regulations 2007 (S.S.I. 2007/545)
 The Licensing (Mandatory Conditions No. 2) (Scotland) Regulations 2007 (S.S.I. 2007/546)
 The Glasgow City Council IFSD Tradeston Bridge Scheme 2007 Confirmation Instrument 2007 (S.S.I. 2007/547)
 Act of Sederunt (Rules of the Court of Session Amendment No. 10) (Miscellaneous) 2007 (S.S.I. 2007/548)
 The Infant Formula and Follow-on Formula (Scotland) Regulations 2007 (S.S.I. 2007/549)
 Act of Sederunt (Fees of Sheriff Officers) 2007 (S.S.I. 2007/550)
 The Budget (Scotland) Act 2007 Amendment Order 2007 (S.S.I. 2007/551)
 The Foot-and-Mouth Disease (Export and Movement Restrictions) (Scotland) (No. 2) Regulations 2007 (S.S.I. 2007/552)
 The Licensing (Fees) (Scotland) Regulations 2007 (S.S.I. 2007/553)
 The Scottish Water (Loch Horn and Loch Lunndaidh) Water Order 2007 (S.S.I. 2007/554)
 The A68 Trunk Road (Dalkeith Northern Bypass) (Temporary Prohibition of Traffic, Temporary Prohibition of Overtaking and Temporary Speed Restriction) (No. 2) Order 2007 (S.S.I. 2007/555)
 The A68 Trunk Road (Dalkeith Northern Bypass) (Temporary Prohibition of Traffic, Temporary Prohibition of Overtaking and Temporary Speed Restriction) (No. 3) Order 2007 (S.S.I. 2007/556)
 The Education (Recognised Bodies) (Scotland) Order 2007 (S.S.I. 2007/557)
 The Education (Listed Bodies) (Scotland) Order 2007 (S.S.I. 2007/558)
 The Sheep and Goats (Identification and Traceability) (Scotland) Amendment Regulations 2007 (S.S.I. 2007/559)
 The Inquiries (Scotland) Rules 2007 (S.S.I. 2007/560)
 The A702 Trunk Road (Biggar High Street, Biggar) (Special Event) (Temporary Prohibition of Traffic) Order 2007 (S.S.I. 2007/561)
 The Foot-and-Mouth Disease (Export Restrictions) (Scotland) (No. 2) Regulations 2007 (S.S.I. 2007/562)
 The Scottish Police Services Authority (Police Support Services) (Modification) Order 2007 (S.S.I. 2007/563)
 The Protection of Vulnerable Groups (Scotland) Act 2007 (Commencement No. 2) Order 2007 (S.S.I. 2007/564 (C. 46))
 The Public Contracts and Utilities Contracts (Scotland) Amendment Regulations 2007 (S.S.I. 2007/565)
 The Local Electoral Administration and Registration Services (Scotland) Act 2006 (Commencement No. 3 and Transitional Provision) Order 2007 (S.S.I. 2007/566 (C. 47))
 The Registration of Births, Still-births, Deaths and Marriages (Prescription of Forms) (Scotland) Amendment Regulations 2007 (S.S.I. 2007/567)
 The Crofting Reform etc. Act 2007 (Commencement No. 2) Order 2007 (S.S.I. 2007/568 (C. 48))
 The Transport and Works (Scotland) Act 2007 (Consents under Enactments) Regulations 2007 (S.S.I. 2007/569)
 The Transport and Works (Scotland) Act 2007 (Applications and Objections Procedure) Rules 2007 (S.S.I. 2007/570)
 The Transport and Works (Scotland) Act 2007 (Inquiries and Hearings Procedure) Rules 2007 (S.S.I. 2007/571)
 The A83 Trunk Road (Inveraray) (Temporary Clearway) Order 2007 (S.S.I. 2007/572)
 The Licensing (Transitional and Saving Provisions) (Scotland) Amendment Order 2007 (S.S.I. 2007/573)
 The Gambling Act 2005 (Review of Premises Licences) (Scotland) Amendment Regulations 2007 (S.S.I. 2007/574)
 The Housing (Scotland) Act 2006 (Penalty Charge) Regulations 2007 (S.S.I. 2007/575)
 The Scottish Police Services Authority (Staff Transfer) (No. 2) Order 2007 (S.S.I. 2007/576)
 The Zoonoses and Animal By-Products (Fees) (Scotland) Regulations 2007 (S.S.I. 2007/577)
 The North East Unit Trunk Roads Area (Temporary Prohibitions of Traffic, Temporary Prohibitions of Overtaking and Temporary Speed Restrictions) (No. 12) Order 2007 (S.S.I. 2007/578)
 The North West Unit Trunk Roads Area (Temporary Prohibitions of Traffic, Temporary Prohibitions of Overtaking and Temporary Speed Restrictions) (No. 12) Order 2007 (S.S.I. 2007/579)
 The South East Unit Trunk Roads Area (Temporary Prohibitions of Traffic, Temporary Prohibitions of Overtaking and Temporary Speed Restrictions) (No. 12) Order 2007 (S.S.I. 2007/580)
 The South West Unit Trunk Roads Area (Temporary Prohibitions of Traffic, Temporary Prohibitions of Overtaking and Temporary Speed Restrictions) (No.12) Order 2007 (S.S.I. 2007/581)
 The A9 Trunk Road (Highland Lights, Kessock Bridge) (Special Event) (Temporary Prohibition of Traffic) Order 2007 (S.S.I. 2007/582)
 The A9 Trunk Road (Highland Lights, Kessock Bridge) (Special Event) (Temporary Restriction of Speed) Order 2007 (S.S.I. 2007/583)
 The A7 Trunk Road (Auchenrivock Improvement) (Temporary Prohibition of Traffic, Temporary Prohibition of Overtaking and Temporary Speed Restriction) Order 2007 (S.S.I. 2007/584)

External links
 Scottish Statutory Instrument List)
 Scottish  Draft Statutory Instrument List

2007
2007 in Scotland
Scotland Statutory Instruments